Altwood is a historic plantation house located near Faunsdale, Alabama.   It was built in 1836 by Richard H. Adams and began as a log dogtrot house.  It was then expanded until it came to superficially resemble a Tidewater-type cottage.  Brought to the early Alabama frontier by settlers from the Tidewater and Piedmont regions of Virginia, this vernacular house-type is usually a story-and-a-half in height, displays strict symmetry, and is characterized by prominent end chimneys flanking a steeply pitched longitudinal gable roof that is often pierced by dormer windows.

It was added to the Alabama Register of Landmarks and Heritage on February 19, 1988, and to the National Register of Historic Places on July 13, 1993, as a part of the Plantation Houses of the Alabama Canebrake and Their Associated Outbuildings Multiple Property Submission.

References

National Register of Historic Places in Marengo County, Alabama
Houses on the National Register of Historic Places in Alabama
Houses completed in 1836
Dogtrot architecture in Alabama
Tidewater-type cottage architecture in Alabama
Plantation houses in Alabama
Properties on the Alabama Register of Landmarks and Heritage
Houses in Marengo County, Alabama